Scirtes goliai is a species of marsh beetle in the family Scirtidae. It is found in the Caribbean Sea and North America.

References

Further reading

 
 

Scirtoidea
Articles created by Qbugbot
Beetles described in 2012